Joseph II (1360 – 10 June 1439) was Patriarch of Constantinople from 1416 to 1439.

Born the (possibly illegitimate) son of Ivan Shishman of Bulgaria in 1360, and a Greek mother, little is known of his early life before he became a monk on Mount Athos. He became Metropolitan of Ephesus in 1393, before being elected Patriarch of Constantinople on 21 May 1416. Together with Byzantine Emperor John VIII Palaiologos, 23 Metropolitan bishops and about 700 scholars and theologians, he took part in the Council of Florence. While in Florence, he was quartered in the Palazzo Ferrantini. He is portrayed in Benozzo Gozzoli's frescoes in the Magi Chapel of Palazzo Medici Riccardi, which celebrates the entrance of the Byzantine dignitaries in the city.

Joseph was very old and ill and died on 10 June 1439. His death caused much grief to all present at the council, as he was a fervent supporter of union between the Churches; before his death, he drew up and signed an important pro-union declaration for the council. His grave in the Dominican convent church of Santa Maria Novella in Florence survives, with an elaborate fresco portrait in a semi-Byzantine style. He was succeeded as Patriarch of Constantinople by Metrophanes II, who was appointed by Emperor John VIII on account of his similarly pro-unionist sentiments.

He was cousin of Constantine II of Bulgaria.

References

Sources 
 Council of Florence, at the Catholic Encyclopedia
 Sergey F. Dezhnyuk, "Council of Florence: The Unrealized Union", CreateSpace, 2017.
 Plamen Pavlov. Patriarh Jossif II

External links 
 

1360 births
1439 deaths
Converts to Eastern Catholicism from Eastern Orthodoxy
Greek Eastern Catholics
Former Greek Orthodox Christians
Bulgarian Orthodox bishops
Sratsimir dynasty
14th-century Bulgarian people
15th-century Bulgarian people
15th-century patriarchs of Constantinople
Bishops of Ephesus
Sons of emperors
People associated with Mount Athos